The 2015 Campeonato Roraimense de Futebol was the 56th edition of Roraima's top professional football league. The competition began on 28 March and ended on 9 May. Náutico won the championship by the 3rd time.

First stage

Second stage

Group A

Group B

Semi-finals

Final

References 

Roraima
Campeonato Roraimense